The common wombat (Vombatus ursinus),  also known as the coarse-haired wombat or bare-nosed wombat, is a marsupial, one of three extant species of wombats and the only one in the genus Vombatus.

Taxonomy
 
The common wombat was first described by George Shaw in 1800. There are three extant subspecies:

Bass Strait (common) wombat (V. u. ursinus), the nominate form, was once found throughout the Bass Strait Islands, but is now restricted to Flinders Island to the north of Tasmania. Its population was estimated at 4,000 in 1996 and is listed as vulnerable by the Environment Protection and Biodiversity Conservation Act 1999 and IUCN Red List.
Hirsute wombat (V. u. hirsutus) is found on the Australian mainland.
Tasmanian wombat (V. u. tasmaniensis) is found in Tasmania. It is smaller than V. u. hirsutus.

Hackett's wombat (V. hacketti) is an extinct species of genus Vombatus, inhabiting the southwestern part of Australia. Being around the same size as V. ursinus, with an average weight of 30 kg, V. hacketti went extinct at the end of the Late Pleistocene, in the Quaternary extinction event.

Description
Common wombats are sturdy and built close to the ground. When fully grown, they can reach between 80 and 130 cm, and weigh between 17 and 40 kg. The wombats found on Tasmania and Flinders Island are often smaller than their mainland counterparts. It is distinguished from both hairy-nosed wombats by its bald nose.

Distribution and habitat

Common wombats are widespread in the cooler and better-watered parts of southern and eastern Australia, including Tasmania and Victoria , and in mountain districts as far north as southern Queensland.

Common wombats can be found at any elevation in the south of their range, but in the north of their range are only found in higher, more mountainous areas. They may be found in a variety of habitats including rainforest, eucalyptus forest, woodland, alpine grassland, and coastal areas. In some regions, they have adapted to farmland and can even be seen grazing in open fields with cattle and sheep.

Behaviour
Common wombats have been described as ecological engineers, as their burrow building results in soil turnover and aeration, which assists plant growth, and provides habitat for a range of invertebrate and vertebrate species.

Common wombats are a solitary, territorial species, with each wombat having an established range in which it lives and feeds. In this area, they dig a tunnel system, with tunnels ranging from 2 to 20 m in length, along with many side tunnels. Usually, only one entrance to the burrow exists, although they may create a smaller one with which to escape.

A wide range of other animals are known to make use of wombat burrows including reptiles, rodents, rabbits, echidnas, wallabies, birds and koalas. Wombats are usually fairly tolerant of non-threatening species, and have a number of burrows that they can occupy.

Many wombats can live in the same burrow, and wombats normally live in the same burrow for their whole lifespan unless the wombat is forced out of the burrow by farmers or other animal species, or unless the burrow is destroyed. Often nocturnal, the common wombat does come out during the day in cooler weather, such as in early morning or late afternoon.

Diet

Bare-nosed wombats are herbivorous, subsisting on grass, snow tussocks, and other plant materials. Foraging is usually done during the night. They are the only marsupial in the world whose teeth constantly grow. Due to the underlying enamel structure of the teeth, the continuously growing teeth maintain a self-sharpening ridge which allows easier grazing of the diet consisting of mainly native grasses.

Breeding
The common wombat can breed every two years and produce a single joey. The gestation period is about 20–30 days, and the young remain in the pouch for five months. The joey is weaned  around 12 to 15 months of age, and is usually independent at 18 months of age. Wombats have an average lifespan of 15 years in the wild and 20 years in captivity.

References

Mammals described in 1800
Mammals of New South Wales
Mammals of Queensland
Mammals of South Australia
Mammals of Tasmania
Mammals of Victoria (Australia)
Marsupials of Australia
Vombatiforms